The men's 400 metres event at the 1986 World Junior Championships in Athletics was held in Athens, Greece, at Olympic Stadium on 16 and 18 July.

Medalists

Results

Final
18 July

Semifinals
18 July

Semifinal 1

Semifinal 2

Semifinal 3

Heats
16 July

Heat 1

Heat 2

Heat 3

Heat 4

Heat 5

Heat 6

Heat 7

Participation
According to an unofficial count, 53 athletes from 38 countries participated in the event.

References

400 metres
400 metres at the World Athletics U20 Championships